The Faroese Chess Championship is organized by the Faroese Chess Association (TSF), which was established in 1970. The championship has been held annually since 1972.

National championship winners

{| class="sortable wikitable"
! Year !! Champion
|-
| 1972 || Hans Petersen
|-
| 1973 ||Suní Ziska
|-
| 1974 ||Luitjen Apol
|-
| 1975 ||Luitjen Apol
|-
| 1976 ||Luitjen Apol
|-
| 1977 ||Hanus Joensen
|-
| 1978 ||John Jacobsen
|-
| 1979 || Jens Christian Hansen
|-
| 1980 ||Súni Ziska
|-
| 1981 || Jens Christian Hansen
|-
| 1982 || Jens Christian Hansen
|-
| 1983 ||Andrias Ziska
|-
| 1984 ||Torkil Nielsen
|-
| 1985 || Jens Christian Hansen
|-
| 1986 || Torkil Nielsen
|-
| 1987 ||Bogi Ziska
|-
| 1988 || Torkil Nielsen
|-
| 1989 ||Heini Olsen
|-
| 1990 || 
|-
| 1991 ||Heini Olsen
|-
| 1992 ||Heini Olsen
|- 
| 1993 ||Heini Olsen
|-
| 1994 ||Torbjørn Thomsen
|- 
| 1995 || 
|-
| 1996 ||Rógvi W. Rasmussen
|-
| 1997 || 
|- 
| 1998 || 
|-
| 1999 ||Heini Olsen
|-
| 2000 ||Flóvin Tór Næs
|-
| 2001 ||John Rødgaard
|-
| 2002 ||Hans Kristian Simonsen
|-
| 2003 ||Martin Poulsen
|-
| 2004 ||Martin Poulsen
|-
| 2005 ||Carl Eli Nolsøe Samuelsen
|-
| 2006 ||Martin Poulsen
|-
| 2007 ||John Rødgaard
|-
| 2008 || Helgi Dam Ziska
|-
| 2009 ||Martin Poulsen
|-
| 2010 ||Olaf Berg
|-
| 2011 ||Helgi Dam Ziska
|-
| 2012 || 
|-
| 2013 ||Olaf Berg
|-
| 2014 || 
|-
| 2015 ||Rógvi Egilstoft Nielsen
|- 
| 2016 ||Rógvi Egilstoft Nielsen
|- 
| 2017 ||Helgi Dam Ziska
|- 
| 2018 ||Helgi Dam Ziska
|- 
| 2019 ||Helgi Dam Ziska
|-
|2020
|
|}

References

Chess in the Faroe Islands
Chess national championships
Chess
Recurring sporting events established in 1972
Chess
1972 in chess